Soosia diodonta is a species of air-breathing land snail, a terrestrial pulmonate gastropod mollusk in the family Helicodontidae.

Distribution 
The distribution of Soosia diodonta includes south-eastern Europe:
 Eastern Serbia
 Western Romania
 Bulgaria

References

Helicodontidae
Gastropods described in 1821